Yang Chiu-hsing (born 15 May 1956) is a Taiwanese politician. He was a Minister without Portfolio in the Executive Yuan and Magistrate of Kaohsiung County.

Kaohsiung County Magistracy
Yang was elected as the Magistrate of Kaohsiung County after winning the 2001 Kaohsiung magisterial election as a Democratic Progressive Party (DPP) candidate on 1 December 2001 and took office on 20 December 2001. He was reelected for ta second magisterial term after winning the 2005 Kaohsiung magisterial election under DPP on 3 December 2005 and took office on 20 December 2005.

2010 Kaohsiung Mayoralty election
On 27 November 2010, Yang joined Kaohsiung City Mayoralty election as independent candidate. However, he lost to incumbent Kaohsiung City Mayor Chen Chu, the Democratic Progressive Party candidate.

2014 Kaohsiung Mayoral election

On 29 November 2014, Yang joined Kaohsiung City mayoralty election as Kuomintang candidate for Mayor of Kaohsiung position, going against his rival incumbent Mayor Chen Chu of DPP. He however lost to Chen.

References

Magistrates of Kaohsiung County
Living people
1956 births
Democratic Progressive Party (Taiwan) politicians
Kuomintang politicians in Taiwan